The smart cow problem is the concept that, when a group of individuals is faced with a technically difficult task, only one of their members has to solve it. When the problem has been solved once, an easily repeatable method may be developed, allowing the less technically proficient members of the group to accomplish the task.

The term smart cow problem is thought to be derived from the expression: "It only takes one smart cow to open the latch of the gate, and then all the other cows follow."

This concept has been applied to digital rights management (DRM), where, due to the rapid spread of information on the Internet, it only takes one individual's defeat of a DRM scheme to render the method obsolete.

See also 
 Jon Lech Johansen (aka "DVD Jon", among the first hackers to crack DVD encryption)
 Script kiddie (an unskilled hacker who relies on tools created by others)

References 

Digital rights management
Hacker culture
Technology neologisms